"And Can It Be That I Should Gain?" is a Christian hymn written by Charles Wesley in 1738 to celebrate his conversion, which he regarded as having taken place on 21 May of that year. The hymn celebrates personal salvation through the death and resurrection of Jesus, and is one of the most popular Methodist hymns today.

History
Charles Wesley (1707–1788), along with his brother John Wesley, was one of the founding figures of Methodism. Like his brother, he was profoundly influenced by a religious conversion. Charles's experience took place on 21 May 1738 (the feast of Pentecost), and it inspired him to write two new hymns, "And Can It Be that I Should Gain" and "Where Shall My Wondering Soul Begin?". After this, Charles went on to become a prolific hymnodist, composing over 6,500 hymns.

The original six-verse hymn "And Can It Be?" was first published  in 1739 in John Wesley's hymnal, Hymns and Sacred Poems, with the title "Free Grace".

The hymn remains popular today and is included in many contemporary hymn books. In 2013, following a survey conducted by the BBC Television programme Songs of Praise,  "And Can It Be?" was voted number 6 in the UK's Top 100 Hymns. Diarmaid MacCulloch suggests that the hymn is one of the best-loved of Wesley's six thousand hymns.

"And Can It Be?" was the source for Phillips, Craig & Dean's 2003 Contemporary Christian song "You Are My King (Amazing Love)". The Newsboys' cover of the song reached No. 1 on the Billboard Christian songs chart.

Words

The title and first lines of the hymn are framed as a rhetorical question written in the first person, in which the narrator/singer asks if he can benefit from the sacrifice of Jesus (the blood of Christ), despite being the cause of Christ's death. The hymn makes reference to several biblical events, and each verse returns to the individual's experience of faith and personal salvation.

The second verse expresses amazement at the apparent paradox of the death of the immortal Christ — "'Tis mystery all! Th'Immortal dies!" — referring to the New Testament accounts of the Passion of Jesus. The following verse celebrates the Incarnation of Jesus and borrows a verse from Philippians 2:6-8, "Emptied himself of all but Love, and bled for Adam's helpless race".

In the fourth verse ("My chains fell off"), Wesley makes reference to the imprisonments of both Saint Peter and Saint Paul — the Liberation of Peter in Acts 12 and the Liberation of Paul in Acts 16  — as metaphors for the narrator's liberation from sin.
 With the line "Thine eye diffused a quickening ray", Wesley describes the liberating power of God descending on the captive soul using words closely based on a line from Alexander Pope's 1717 poem Eloisa to Abelard:

Thy eyes diffus'd a reconciling ray,
And gleams of glory brighten'd all the day.

The fifth verse uses words from Romans 8:1 to describe the doctrine of Justification by faith — "No condemnation now I dread" — and looks forward to the believer receiving a crown in heaven after death.

Musical setting

Early publications of "And Can It Be?" set the hymn to a variety of tunes. One of the first settings was to the tune , composed by the songwriter and dramatist Henry Carey. In A Collection of Tunes, Set to Music, as they are commonly sung at the Foundery (1742) the hymn was set to Samuel Akeroyde's tune , and in the 1786 edition of A Collection of Hymns, the tune  was specified.

Today the hymn is most commonly sung to the tune  which was composed by Yorkshireman Thomas Campbell (1800-1876). It was first published in 1825 in his hymnal The Bouquet: a collection of tunes composed and adapted to Wesley's Hymns; the floral title referred to Campbell's tunes all being given botanical names. , named after Sagina, a small flowering plant, was published to accompany a translation by John Wesley of a German hymn by Johann Scheffler, "Thee will I love, my strength, my tow'r" ("Ich will dich lieben, meine Stärke")

Musicologist Percy Scholes characterises this type of tune as "Old Methodist" and considers that its style may have been influenced by the popular choruses of George Frideric Handel.

References

External links
 
Hymnary.org, And Can It Be, That I Should Gain?

English Christian hymns
18th-century Christian texts
Hymns by Charles Wesley
1738 works
Protestant hymns
18th-century hymns